Long Live Tonight is the second album from Crashcarburn, released in 2010. With the most popular songs in South Africa being "Twisted", "Long Live Tonight" and "Skin Versus Bone" on radio and South African charts. Long Live Tonight earned the band two SAMA nominations. This is the band's second album after first major album This City Needs a Hero.

Track listing

Personnel
Garth Barnes - Guitar, vocals
Dylan Belton - Guitar
Brendan Barnes - drums
Chris Brink - Bass guitar, backing vocals
Mike Stott - Guitar, backing vocals

References

External links 
 www.crashcarburn.com

2010 albums
Crashcarburn albums